Notre-Dame-de-Bonne-Nouvelle, located at 25 Rue de la Lune, in the 2nd arrondissement of Paris and is a Catholic parish church built between 1823 and 1830. It is built in the Neoclassical style, and is dedicated to Notre-Dame de Bonne-Nouvelle ("our lady of good news"), referring to the Annunciation. The neighbourhood of  Bonne-Nouvelle, the Boulevard de Bonne-Nouvelle (one of the Grand Boulevards that replaced the Louis XIII wall in 1709) and the Bonne Nouvelle metro station are named after it. The church was registered as a national historical monument in 1983.

History 
The first chapel was built on the site in 1551, originally dedicated to Saint Louis and Saint Barbara, then rededicated to the Bonne Nouvelle, or the Annunciation of the coming of Christ. This first church was destroyed  1591 by the Catholic League during the siege of Paris by the future Henry IV. Queen Anne of Austria laid the first stone of a new church in 1628. During the French Revolution, the building was badly damaged and in 1823 finally had to be pulled down.  

The new church was built between 1823 and 1830 by the architect Étienne-Hippolyte Godde in the neoclassical style, which was very popular following the Restoration of the French Monarchy.

Exterior 

The facade of the church, facing north, is modelled after an ancient Roman basilica, with two Doric order columns forming a peristyle over the porch. The bell tower is the only surviving vestige of the earlier 17th-century exterior.

Interior  

Since the church is surrounded by other taller buildings, the interior of the church is dimly lit. The altar, beneath the dome, is lit by a skylight and three chandeliers. The nave and choir are lined with rows of Doric columns creating arcades with rounded arches. 

The most distinctive feature of the interior is the large octagonal Baptismal Font in center. It is designed for full-immersion baptisms, with the person baptized completely immersed in the water, rather than priest simply touching water on their face. It is one of the seven sacraments which mark entry into a Christian life, a ceremony dating back to ancient Christian church. The octagonal font is surrounded with mosaics which depict the symbols of the four Evangelists; a lion (Saint Mark), a bull (Saint Luke), an eagle (Saint John) and a man with wings (Saint Matthew). The seven step represent the seven capital sins. The steps stop at  bronze and nickel cross set into the floor.Dumoulin, "Les Églises de Paris" (2017), p. 41

Art and Decoration 

The choir of the church displays paintings by three notable Baroque artists from the 16th and 17th centuries. 
 "The Annunciation" by Giovanni Lanfranco (1582-1647) of Parma, ar vivid Baroque display of skill with darkness and light, and tones of red and orange, around the figures of the Virgin Mary and the Angel Gabriel. 
  "The satisfaction of Isabel of France" by Philippe de Champagne (1602-1674). This painting depicts the dedication of the monastery of Longchamps to the Virgin Mary by its founder, Isabel, the sister of Louis IX, or Saint Louis, featuring the figures of Isabel and the against a background of the Paris cityscape. 
 "The Virgin Surrounded by the Saints" by Ludovico Cardi of Florence (1559-1613). This shows The Virgin meeting Saint John the Evangelist, Mary Magdalen, Saint Dominic, and Pope Pius V.   

A notable 19th century work with a Parisian theme is found in the lower left aisle: "Saint Genevieve distributing bread to the Parisians", by Jean-Victor Schnetz (1787-1870)

Organ 

The church organ was built by John Abbey at the end of the 19th century, then was restored in 1950 by Joseph Gutschenritter, and again in 1988 by Jean-Marc Cicchero.

Bibliography

Notes and Citations

See also 
 List of historic churches in Paris

External Links 
  Web site of the church

Roman Catholic churches completed in 1830
Monuments historiques of Paris
Roman Catholic churches in the 2nd arrondissement of Paris
1830 establishments in France
19th-century Roman Catholic church buildings in France